Jeffrey Salloway is a scientist and politician, currently serving as a representative for Strafford County's 5th District in the New Hampshire House of Representatives. Previously, he was a professor of Epidemiology at New Hampshire University. He is currently a Professor Emeritus.

References

External links

Living people
Democratic Party members of the New Hampshire House of Representatives
21st-century American politicians
Year of birth missing (living people)
Place of birth missing (living people)